Adil Jehangir Jussawalla (born 8 April 1940, Mumbai) is an Indian poet, magazine editor and translator. He has written two books of poetry, 'Land's End' and 'Missing Person'.

'Sea Breeze Bombay' is a fine, city poem by this poet. It is actually a response to the historical incident of partition in the year 1947 according to the poet, Bombay is a 'Surrogate City'. It provided shelter to numerous refugees after partition, during which there were many riots in India. Thousands of people were killed and many became homeless. The city Bombay acted as a substitute or surrogate mother to all refugees.

In the poem 'Sea Breeze Bombay' the poet presents a picture of the suffering of the refugees. These people from the north got relief in the worst heat. In the city many communities were reformed. In the hot sun a cool breeze gives pleasant, soothing experience. In the same way, the city Bombay also provided pleasant experience to all the refugees.

Biography
He was born to a Parsi family and completed his primary education at the Cathedral and John Connon School in 1956. He then attended the Architectural Association School of Architecture in London from 1957–58. Later, he studied at University College, Oxford, receiving his M.A. in 1964.

He worked briefly as a substitute teacher for the Greater London Council, then became a language teacher at the EF International Language Centre; a post he held until 1969. He then returned to Mumbai, where he taught at several colleges, becoming a lecturer in English language and literature at St. Xavier's College in 1972.

He was an Honorary Fellow of the International Writing Program at the University of Iowa in 1976. After that, he focused on journalism, serving as the book review editor at The Indian Express from 1980–81 and literary editor for The Express Magazine from 1980–82. In 1987, he became the literary editor for Debonair, a magazine originally modeled after Playboy. In 1989, he was promoted to editor and served in that position for several years, after which he returned to his writing career. He has also translated several works by Gulam Mohammed Sheikh. Together with Arvind Krishna Mehrotra, Arun Kolatkar and Gieve Patel, he helped create "Clearing House", a poet's publishing co-operative.

In 2014, he was presented with the Sahitya Akademi Award for his book of poetry, Trying to Say Goodbye.

Selected works
 Trying to Say Goodbye, Almost Island Books, 2011 
 The Right Kind of Dog, Duckbill Books, 2013  
 Maps for a Mortal Moon: Essays and Entertainments (edited by Jerry Pinto), Aleph Books, 2014 
 I Dreamt a Horse Fell From the Sky, a collection of poetry and prose, Hachette, 2015

Appearances in the following poetry Anthologies 
 The Oxford India Anthology of Twelve Modern Indian Poets (1992) ed. by Arvind Krishna Mehrotra and published by Oxford University Press, New Delhi
 The Golden Treasure of Writers Workshop Poetry (2008) ed. by Rubana Huq and published by Writers Workshop, Calcutta

Interviews

An interview with Jussawalla by Sohini Das Gupta @ Daily News and Analysis
An appreciation of Jussawalla by Bijay Kant Dubey @ the Literarism blog
"Before and After: An Interview with Adil Jussawalla" Almost Island journal.

References

External links
 by Adil Jussawalla @ World Literature Today

1940 births
Writers from Mumbai
20th-century Indian poets
Indian magazine editors
English-language poets from India
20th-century Indian translators
Parsi writers
International Writing Program alumni
Living people